Raveh (also Romanized as Rāveh) is a village in Do Dehak Rural District, in the Central District of Delijan County, Markazi Province, Iran. At the 2006 census, its population was 1,510, in 366 families.

References 

Populated places in Delijan County